Tun Hussein Onn Jamek Mosque or Larkin Jamek Mosque is a mosque in Larkin Sentral, Larkin, Johor Bahru, Johor, Malaysia. It was named after former Malaysia's third Prime Minister, Tun Hussein Onn.

See also
 Islam in Malaysia

References

Buildings and structures in Johor Bahru
Mosques in Johor